Events in the year 1630 in Norway.

Incumbents
Monarch: Christian IV

Events
Risør obtains the status of ladested (special trading port), subordinate to Skien.
The Kvikne Copper Works, starts to operate, it is operated from 1630 to 1912.

Arts and literature

Births

16 April – Lambert van Haven, Norwegian-born Danish architect (died 1695)
16 November – Edvard Edvardsen, educator and historian (died 1695).

Exact date missing 
c.1630 – Karen Mowat, heiress and landowner (d. 1675)

Deaths

See also

References